Chakhmaqlu or Chakhmaghlu may refer to:
 Chakhmaqlu, Ardabil
 Chakhmaqlu, North Khorasan
 Chakhmaqlu-ye Sofla, West Azerbaijan Province